Proverbs 4 is the fourth chapter of the Book of Proverbs in the Hebrew Bible or the Old Testament of the Christian Bible. The book is a compilation of several wisdom literature collections, with the heading in 1:1 may be intended to regard Solomon as the traditional author of the whole book, but the dates of the individual collections are difficult to determine, and the book probably obtained its final shape in the post-exilic period. This chapter is a part of the first collection of the book. The Jerusalem Bible entitles this chapter, "On choosing wisdom".

Text
The original text is written in Hebrew language. This chapter is divided into 27 verses.

Textual witnesses
Some early manuscripts containing the text of this chapter in Hebrew are of the Masoretic Text, which includes the Aleppo Codex (10th century), and Codex Leningradensis (1008). 

There is also a translation into Koine Greek known as the Septuagint, made in the last few centuries BC; some extant ancient manuscripts of this version include Codex Vaticanus (B; B; 4th century), Codex Sinaiticus (S; BHK: S; 4th century), and Codex Alexandrinus (A; A; 5th century).

Analysis
This chapter belongs to a section regarded as the first collection in the book of Proverbs (comprising Proverbs 1–9), known as "Didactic discourses". The Jerusalem Bible describes chapters 1–9 as a prologue of the chapters 10–22:16, the so-called "[actual] proverbs of Solomon", as "the body of the book". 

This chapter has the following structure: 
an exhortation to acquire wisdom (verses 1–4a), 
a list of the benefits of wisdom (4b–9), 
a call to pursue a righteous lifestyle (10–13), 
a warning against a wicked lifestyle (14–19), and 
an exhortation to righteousness (20–27).

Get Wisdom! (4:1–9)
This passage focuses on the value of Wisdom, so it needs to be acquired at all costs (verse 7). The father's appeal (verses 1–2) is reinforced by recounting his own experience when he was taught the lesson by his own parents (verses 3–4), demonstrating the importance of a "home" as the place for an educational discipline to get Wisdom (cf. Exodus 12:26–27; Deuteronomy 6:6–7, 20–25), and the transmission from one generation to the next. In verses 6–9 Wisdom is personified as 'a bride to be wooed', and who, in return, will 'love and honor those who embrace her', in contrast to the spurious love and deadly embrace of the seductress.

Verse 1
Hear, O children, the instruction of a father,
and attend to know understanding.
"Know": in Hebrew literally "in order to come to know", from the interpretation of the stative verb , yadaʿ, which can also mean "to learn."

The right way and the wrong way (4:10–27)
The metaphor of a road with two ways in one's life is important in the teaching of Proverbs, even if it occurs many times (cf. Proverbs 1:15,19; 2:8–22; 3:17, 23, etc.), in counseling young people to avoid the path of the wicked, but to stay on the way of wisdom ("paths of uprightness" that is "straight and level"; cf. Proverbs 3:6), which is the good path (cf. Proverbs 2:9) and also the secure path (cf. Proverbs 3:23) without fear of stumbling (verse 12; cf. Psalm 18:36), brightly illuminated (verse 18; steadily increasing brightness from the first flickers of dawn to the full splendor of the noonday sun). On the other hand, the way of the wicked, with evil activities (Proverbs 1:18-19) and twisted paths (Proverbs 2:12–15), is shrouded in 'deep darkness' (verse 19; the same term is used the plague of darkness in Egypt in Exodus 10:22, or as the consequences of the day of the Lord in Joel 2:2; Amos 5:20, etc), which hinders those who walk on it to even see what their feet strike on the final, fatal step (cf. Job 18:7–12; Jeremiah 13:16; 23:12). The appeal to accept the father's words (verse 10) resumes in the final paragraph (verses 20–27) because they are 'life' and 'healing' (verse 22; cf. Proverbs 3:8).

See also

Related Bible parts: Proverbs 1, Proverbs 2, Proverbs 7, Proverbs 9

References

Sources

External links
 Jewish translations:
 Mishlei - Proverbs - Chapter 4 (Judaica Press) translation [with Rashi's commentary] at Chabad.org
 Christian translations:
 Online Bible at GospelHall.org (ESV, KJV, Darby, American Standard Version, Bible in Basic English)
 Book of Proverbs Chapter 4 King James Version
  Various versions

04